Wade Roger Dubielewicz (born January 30, 1979) is a Canadian former professional ice hockey goaltender. He played 43 games in the National Hockey League (NHL) between 2003 and 2010 with three teams: the Columbus Blue Jackets, Minnesota Wild, and New York Islanders. The rest of his career, which lasted from 2003 to 2011, was spent mainly in the American Hockey League.

Following his retirement, he became a goaltending coach for the Columbia Valley Rockies of the KIJHL, where his junior ice hockey career began.

Playing career

Junior
Dubielewicz played at the University of Denver and as a junior in 2001–2002 led his team to the NCAA tournament. He turned down a million-plus-dollar NHL offer to stay at Denver for his senior season and to finish his degree. Before signing with Denver, he played for the Junior A Fernie Ghostriders of the now-dormant RMJHL in Fernie, British Columbia. He played Junior B for the Columbia Valley Rockies of the KIJHL in Invermere, British Columbia, and then moved on to Trail of the BCHL in 1998–99, before ending his junior career the next year for the Chilliwack Chiefs.

Professional
After tending goal for four years at Denver, Dubielewicz was signed as an undrafted free agent by the New York Islanders on May 26, 2003. He joined the Islanders' American Hockey League (AHL) affiliate, the Bridgeport Sound Tigers, where he became a fan favorite at the Arena at Harbor Yard, home of the Tigers. "Dubie" holds numerous AHL league records that still stand as of 2009. He holds the AHL/Sound Tigers records for most shutouts (15) and wins (81) in a career, and highest save percentage (.946) and goals against average (1.38) in a season (during the 2003–04 AHL season), passing the records of Rick DiPietro. Dubielewicz won the Dudley "Red" Garrett Memorial Award as the top rookie in the AHL for 2003–04.

Dubielewicz made his first appearance of the 2006–2007 season for the New York Islanders on March 15, 2007, relieving Mike Dunham. In the regular season, he started the Islanders' final five games with a record of 4–1–0.  On April 8, 2007, in the final game of the season against the New Jersey Devils, after Dubielewicz gave up a goal to John Madden (ice hockey) with .7 seconds left in regulation, he rebounded to stop the Devils in the shootout of a 3–2 victory to send the Islanders into the postseason as the 8th seed, eliminating the Toronto Maple Leafs from playoff contention.

Dubielewicz made his post-season debut on April 12, 2007 on the road in game one of the Eastern Conference Quarter-finals against the Buffalo Sabres. He allowed four goals on 35 shots in a 4–1 loss, giving the Sabres a 1–0 series lead. His teammate Rick DiPietro would get the start in goal for game two, after recovering from an injury.

The Islanders re-signed Dubielewicz to a one-year contract worth $500,000 for the 2007–2008 season. After the season, on June 1, 2008, Newsday reported that Dubielewicz declined the two-way contract extension the Islanders had offered, as he believed that he'd be assigned to the AHL, as Joey MacDonald had a one-way deal.  Dubielewicz had previously voiced a desire to remain an Islander and called himself "an Islander at heart". He signed instead with Ak Bars of the Kontinental Hockey League.

On December 30, 2008, Dubielewicz terminated his contract with Ak Bars by mutual agreement. In the previous month, he was often backing up the younger Stanislav Galimov. Wade left Ak Bars with a record of 11-8-3, a .892 save pct.,  and 2.77 GAA. After an injury to the Islanders' goaltender Joey MacDonald and with starting goalie Rick DiPietro sidelined, Dubielewicz re-signed with the Islanders on January 15, 2009, but the Columbus Blue Jackets claimed him off re-entry waivers on January 17, 2009. Dubielewicz played the rest of the season for Columbus.

Dubielewicz became a free agent in July 2009 and he signed a contract with the Minnesota Wild on July 17. The Wild had two other goalies with NHL experience and he was signed to improve the depth at the position.

Dubielewicz last played in Germany, having signed with the Kölner Haie on September 30, 2010.

Coaching career
In 2012 Dubielewicz became coach of the Columbia Valley Rockies of the KIJHL. He became the general manager of the team in 2020.

Career statistics

Regular season and playoffs

Awards and honours

References

External links

Wade Dubielewicz profile at Kontinental Hockey League website

1979 births
Living people
Ak Bars Kazan players
Bridgeport Sound Tigers players
Canadian expatriate ice hockey players in Germany
Canadian expatriate ice hockey players in Russia
Canadian ice hockey goaltenders
Chilliwack Chiefs players
Columbus Blue Jackets players
Denver Pioneers men's ice hockey players
Ice hockey people from British Columbia
Kölner Haie players
Minnesota Wild players
New York Islanders players
People from the Regional District of East Kootenay
Trail Smoke Eaters (BCHL) players
Undrafted National Hockey League players
AHCA Division I men's ice hockey All-Americans